Egyptian Second Division 2012–13 is the 2012–13 season of the Egyptian Second Division competition. A total of 69 teams are divided into 6 groups based on geographical distribution. The top 2 teams of each group promotes to Promotion play-offs for season (Egyptian Premier League), The Season started on 14 November 2012.

Group 1

Group 2

Group 3

Group 4

Group 5

Group 6

Group 4

Group A

Group B

Group C

References 

Egyptian Second Division seasons
2012–13 in Egyptian football
Egypt